Cerano d'Intelvi is a comune (municipality) in the Province of Como in the Italian region Lombardy, located about  north of Milan and about  north of Como, on the border with Switzerland.

Cerano d'Intelvi borders the following municipalities: Cabbio (Switzerland), Centro Valle Intelvi, Dizzasco, Muggio (Switzerland), Schignano.

References

Cities and towns in Lombardy